Maati Kabbal (born 1954 in Khouribga, Morocco) is a writer, essayist and specialist in Moroccan literature. He is a frequent contributor to  French and Moroccan television programs and newspapers like Libération and Le Monde diplomatique.

References
Le Maroc en mouvement : Créations contemporaines, Éditions Maisonneuve & Larose (2000)
Je t'ai à l'oeil, Éditions Paris-Méditerranée (2002)
Lune solitaire (traduction), Éditions Non Lieu (2006)

External links
Bibliomonde 
Marrakech, Portail marocain d'actualités, "Maroc, éclats instantanés de Maâti Kabbal" 

Living people
Moroccan writers
Moroccan essayists
Moroccan male writers
Male essayists
People from Khouribga
Moroccan male journalists
1954 births